The 2006 Blue Square Greyhound Derby took place during May & June with the final being on 3 June 2006 at Wimbledon Stadium. The winner and defending champion Westmead Hawk received £100,000. Westmead Hawk became only the fourth greyhound in history to win the Derby twice.

Final result 
At Wimbledon (over 480 metres):

Distances 
¾, ¾, ¾, 1¾, 2½ (lengths)
The distances between the greyhounds are in finishing order and shown in lengths. One length is equal to 0.08 of one second.

Race report
Nick Savva's star, who was trailing Mineola Farloe around the last bend, produced his customary burst of late pace to snatch the victory on the home straight in a time of 28.44 (the fastest time of the year at the venue). The four other contenders all ran well breaking 29.00 seconds but none of them could stay with Westmead Hawk.

Quarter finals

Semi finals

See also 
2006 UK & Ireland Greyhound Racing Year

References

Results
Results and video of the race

External links
British Greyhound Racing Board
Greyhound Data

Greyhound Derby
English Greyhound Derby
English Greyhound Derby
English Greyhound Derby
English Greyhound Derby